Cal Air International was a charter airline that operated in the United Kingdom between 1985 and 1988.

History 
Cal Air International was initially conceived in early 1982 after the sudden demise of Laker Airways which had left a large gap in the UK Inclusive tour/charter market. The airline was a joint set up between British Caledonian and the Rank Organisation which already had its interests firmly established in the travel industry with its own tour operators: Blue Sky Travel/Holidays, Wings Holidays, Ellerman Travel and OSL Holidays.

The airline was initially named British Caledonian Charter with exactly the same livery as its parent company British Caledonian. Two ex Laker Airways/Skytrain DC-10-10s were acquired along with many highly experienced ex Laker Airways Pilots, Flight Engineers and Cabin Crew. The DC-10s were re-registered as G-BJZE and G-BJZD. However it was not long before British Caledonian realised that its own high quality scheduled product and image was being somewhat tarnished by the more utility charter product in addition to the general public not being able to differentiate between the two companies, even the charter cabin crew all wore identical tartan uniforms to those of the parent company. It was therefore decided to make slight changes to the charter company and livery by introducing 'BCA Charter' decals to the aircraft and outlining the golden St Andrews lion rampant tail logo with a white shield. This lasted only a short time when a radical step was taken between the Rank Organisation and BCAL to completely rebrand the charter arm as 'Cal Air International' This saw the introduction of a striking bold livery never seen in the UK at the time. 

Cal Air’s DC-10s were mainly used on UK charter flights to the usual popular Mediterranean resorts, North Africa and the Canary Islands. Long haul destinations included Orlando & Tampa Florida, Los Angeles USA, Caribbean, Toronto & Vancouver Canada and The Gambia & Kenya in Africa. A third ex Laker Airways DC-10-10 was acquired in 1986 and re-registered G-GCAL. Occasional ad hoc charter work was also undertaken which saw the companies DC-10s flying to destinations all over the world.

In 1988 British Caledonian was bought by and merged into British Airways. Cal Air International was of no interest to British Airways. The Rank Organisation decided to buy the other 50% share of the company making it the wholly owned subsidiary. This created a problem as the name 'Cal Air International' along with the lion rampant logo in red and its Female Flight Attendants wearing tartan uniforms, was too close in image and style to the new start up British Airways charter airline Caledonian Airways which was now the new face and product of what was known for many years as British Airtours. It was decided that the company would change its name and livery yet again. Various names were seriously considered including 'Bel Air' and 'Phoenix International Airlines'. However, it was Novair International Airways that won the vote. The livery was adapted slightly to take in the new name and a huge shooting blue star was emblazoned on the tail fin. Novair International Airways went on to add three brand new Boeing 737-400 to its fleet of 3 DC-10s deploying them at its Manchester and Glasgow bases.

The company stopped operating & closed its doors for good in early 1990 after the Rank Organisation could not find a suitable buyer. Both McDonnell Douglas DC-10-10s G-BJZD & G-BJZE went to FedEx Express while G-GCAL operates as a flying eye hospital for Orbis International. Some of the Boeing 737-400s went to British Midland International.

Livery 
A predominantly white body with a red sash-like diagonal stripe incorporating large "Cal Air" titling. The tail logo had a large British Caledonian style Scottish Lion Rampant in red.

Fleet 
Cal Air International operated three aircraft in its three years of operation consisting of two ex-Laker Airways McDonnell Douglas DC-10-10s: G-BJZD and G-BJZE. A third DC-10 was acquired in February 1986 G-GCAL. Orders were also placed for 3 MD-80s but these were never fulfilled.

See also
 List of defunct airlines of the United Kingdom

References

External links

Defunct airlines of the United Kingdom
Airlines established in 1985
Airlines disestablished in 1988
British companies established in 1985